Progress is a solo album recorded by original King Crimson drummer Michael Giles.  It was recorded in 1978, but unreleased until 2002.

Overview 
The album was recorded in the 70s (mostly in 1978) in Giles home studio after He and former King Crimson keyboardist and woodwind player recorded their 1970 collaborative album McDonald and Giles. It was released 24 years after being completed (in 2002), it has only been released on CD and with no vinyl or official digital release.

The album features extensive contributions from Caravan multi-instrumentalist Geoffrey Richardson (Who plays guitar, viola, flute and contributes voice and fretless bass to track 6), the album also features Giles, Giles and Fripp alumni and Giles brother, Peter Giles who plays bass guitar on most tracks with the rest being handled by John G. Perry. Keyboards were played by Giles, Canterbury based keyboardist Dave MacRae and Strawbs keyboardist John Mealing

Giles handles vocals & voices on 4 of the 12 tracks on the album (with contributions from Perry and Richardson on 3 & 5 respectively) with 6 of the tracks being instrumentals and the other 2 tracks feature voices by Folk singer Catherine Howe. The album features a small brass section on two tracks which was arranged by Derek Wadsworth and features the alto sax, trumpet, flugelhorn and trombone.

Track listing
All words and music composed, recorded and produced by Michael Giles.

Personnel
Per Discogs

Musicians 
 Michael Giles – drums (2, 3, 5, 7, 8, 9, 10, 11, 12), percussion (1, 2, 3, 6, 9, 11, 12), keyboards (9) piano (1, 2, 4, 6) electric piano (2, 3) clavinet (10) vocals & voices (3, 5, 6, 7), "naive guitar" (6)
 Geoffrey Richardson – guitar (1, 2, 3, 6, 7, 12), flute (4, 5, 6, 8, 12), viola (4, 6, 8), voice (5), fretless bass (6)
 Dave MacRae – piano solo (2), electric piano (5, 12), Hammond organ (10)
 John Mealing – electric piano solo (3), electric piano (4, 10), piano (8)
 Peter Giles – bass guitar (2, 4, 5, 7, 10, 12)
 John G. Perry – bass guitar (3, 8), voice (3)
 Catherine Howe – voice (8, 12)
 Ray Warleigh – alto saxophone (7, 12)
 Martin Drover – trumpet (7), flugelhorn (7, 12)
 Pete Thoms – trombone (7, 12)
 Michael Blakesley – trombone (8, 10)
 Colin Bryant – clarinet (10)
 Jimmy Hastings – tenor saxophone (10)

Production 

 Derek Wadsworth – brass arranger (7, 12)
 Rob Ayling – coordination 
 Hugh O'Donnell – design
 Michael Giles – liner notes, photograph [Cottage And Rainbow Photos] (as M. G)
 Simon Heyworth – Mastering at HDCD mastering 
 William Giles – painting
 David K. Wells – photograph [Photography And Image Preparation] 
 Hugh Padgham – post production

References 

2002 albums
Michael Giles albums